Starcevich is a Croatian surname. It is patronymic from the words starac, meaning ″old man″ or ″elder.″ Notable people with this surname include:

Brandon Starcevich (born 1999), Australian rules footballer
Craig Starcevich (born 1967), Australian rules footballer
Max Starcevich (1911–1990), American football guard
Tom Starcevich (1918–1989), Victoria Cross recipient

See also 
 Starčević

Croatian surnames